Thomas Jeter may refer to:

 Thomas Bothwell Jeter (1827–1883), 79th Governor of South Carolina
 Thomas Jeter (fencer) (1898–1979), American Olympic fencer
Tom Jeter, fictional character